Deborah Teramis Christian is an American author and game designer. She previously worked under the name Deborah Christian, but now prefers to be called by her middle name and uses her full name on book credits. Teramis has also used the pen-name Terry Randall on some of her RPG works. She is a US army veteran.

Career
Deborah Christian has designed and edited role-playing game materials for Dungeons & Dragons, including Tales of the Outer Planes, The Minrothad Guilds, Lords of Darkness, Bestiary of Dragons and Giants, Adventure Pack I, Dragon Dawn, and Kara-Tur: The Eastern Realms.

She also writes fiction under the name Deborah Teramis Christian.

Novels
 Splintegrate (2014) 
 Mainline (1996)
 Kar Kilam (1998)
 The Truthsayer's Apprentice (1999)

References

External links
 Deborah Christian's official website

20th-century American novelists
20th-century American women writers
21st-century American novelists
21st-century American women writers
American women novelists
Dungeons & Dragons game designers
Living people
Place of birth missing (living people)
Women science fiction and fantasy writers
Year of birth missing (living people)